Trần Ngọc Sơn (born 26 October 1997) is a Vietnamese footballer who plays as a forward for V.League 2 club Phố Hiến

Honours

Club
Viettel F.C
V.League 2
 Runners-up :  2016

References

1997 births
Living people
Vietnamese footballers
Association football goalkeepers
Viettel FC players